Mother Song (German: Mutterlied) is a 1937 German-Italian musical drama film directed by Carmine Gallone and starring Beniamino Gigli, Maria Cebotari and Hans Moser. It was produced by Itala Film, a Berlin-based production company with strong links to Italy.

It was shot at the Cinecittà Studios in Rome and on location in Pisa. The film's sets were designed by the art directors Gabriel Pellon, Giorgio Pinzauti, Ernst Richter and Heinrich Richter.

Cast
 Beniamino Gigli as Ettore Vanni 
 Maria Cebotari as Fiamma Vanni - seine Frau 
 Peter Bosse as Mario - sein Sohn 
 Hans Moser as Giulio Stückelmeier 
 Michael Bohnen as Cesare Doret 
 Hilde Hildebrand as Ricarda Doret, seine Frau 
 Alfred Gerasch as Intendant 
 Josef Dahmen as Inspizient 
 Werner Pledath as Arzt 
 Hilde Maroff as Krankenschwester 
 Herbert Gernot as Lawyer
 Rio Nobile as Chauffeur
 Max Paetz as Garderobier

References

Bibliography 
 Waldman, Harry. Nazi Films in America, 1933–1942. McFarland, 2008.

External links 
 

1937 films
Films of Nazi Germany
German musical drama films
1930s musical drama films
1930s German-language films
Films directed by Carmine Gallone
Tobis Film films
Films shot at Cinecittà Studios
1937 drama films
1930s German films

it:Mutterlied